The European Shooting Confederation (ESC) is an association of the International Shooting Sport Federation's member federations from Europe, the Caucasus, Cyprus, Israel, and Turkey. After the 2022 Russian invasion of Ukraine, the ISSF banned Russian and Belarusian athletes and officials from its competitions. In addition, the ESC stripped Russia of its right to host the 2022 European Shooting Championships in the 25m, 50m, 300m, running target and shotgun.

European Championships
Last editions disputed

Competitions administered by the ESC
European Championships in all ISSF shooting events except airgun events are held every odd-numbered year in July or August
Extra European Championships in shotgun events and junior events are held in all other years
European Championships in 10 metre air rifle, 10 metre air pistol, 10 metre running target and 10 metre running target mixed are held every year at the end of the indoor season, typically in March
The European Cup 300 m (currently Lapua European Cup 300 m) in the non-Olympic 300 metre rifle three positions, 300 metre rifle prone and 300 metre standard rifle with a similar season structure to the ISSF World Cup in Olympic events
The European Cup 25 m (currently Walther European Cup 25 m) in the non-Olympic 25 metre center-fire pistol and 25 metre standard pistol
The European Shotgun Tournament
The ESC Youth League for national teams in 10 metre air rifle and 10 metre air pistol, in preparation for the Youth Olympic Games, premiering in 2009

References

External links
 
 Archive Results

Sports governing bodies in Europe
Shooting sports in Europe by country
Shooting sports organizations